Kızıldağ National Park, established on May 19, 1969, is a national park in southern Turkey. It is located in the Yenişarbademli-Şarkikaraağaç-Aksu districts of Isparta Province.

Gallery

References

National parks of Turkey
Geography of Isparta Province
Landforms of Isparta Province
Tourist attractions in Isparta Province
Yenişarbademli District
Şarkikaraağaç District
Aksu District (Isparta)
1969 establishments in Turkey
Protected areas established in 1969